My Babu (1945–1970) was a French-bred Thoroughbred racehorse who became one of the most influential sires in American breeding of show jumpers, eventers and hunters. His descendants include Bruce Davidson's former eventing mount JJ Babu, Anky van Grunsven's dressage horse Bonfire, and puissance and grand prix jumper Sympatico. Also, the grand prix jumper Napur is related to him through his sire Damascus dam Kerala. My Babu was the sire of Kerala, and therefore one of Napur's grandsires.

Racing career
During My Babu's racing career in England, the bay colt had 16 starts, 11 wins, 2 places, and 0 shows, with career earnings of £29,830. His most important win came in the 1948 Classic, the 2000 Guineas Stakes in which he set a new stakes record time. He was later sold in 1955 to Americans Leslie W. Combs II and John W. Hanes for over $600,000, the highest price ever paid for a Thoroughbred imported to the United States. The stallion stood at Spendthrift Farm in Kentucky during his breeding career.

Stud record
My Babu was a sire of 47 stakes winners and was a broodmare sire of 95 winners. He earned the title of Leading Juvenile Sire in 1960.  His son, Better Boy, was the Leading sire in Australia four times. By 1965, his racing descendants had won over $3,000,000. My Babu was the grandsire of National Museum of Racing and Hall of Fame inductee Precisionist, and the damsire of Hall of Fame inductees Damascus and Gamely as well as the damsire of Little Current, the 1974 American Champion Three-Year-old Colt and winner of the Preakness and Belmont Stakes.

Pedigree

References

1945 racehorse births
1970 racehorse deaths
Sport horse sires
Racehorses trained in the United Kingdom
Racehorses bred in France
Thoroughbred family 1-w
Byerley Turk sire line
Chefs-de-Race
2000 Guineas winners